The triathlon competition at the 2019 Southeast Asian Games in the Philippines was held at the Subic Bay Freeport Zone. from 1 to 2 December 2019. The competitions were won by John Chicano and Kim Mangrobang, both of the Philippines.

Competition schedule
The men's and women's individual race took place on 1 December 2019. The mixed relay event was originally scheduled to take place on 4 December 2019 but was rescheduled to take place earlier on 2 December 2019 due to the anticipated weather caused by Typhoon Kanmuri (Tisoy).

All times are Philippine Standard Time (UTC+8).

Medal summary

Medal table

Events

Participating nations
A total of athletes from 6 nations participated (the numbers of athletes are shown in parentheses).

Results
Swimming denotes the time it took the athlete to complete the swimming leg; cycling denotes the time it took the athlete to complete the cycling leg; running denotes the time it took the athlete to complete the running leg. The difference denotes the time difference between the athlete and the event winner. The total time includes both transitions.

Men's individual

Women's individual

References

External links